The 2016 in cycling results is given as follows:

BMX racing
 January 1 – December 11: 2016 UCI BMX Events Calendar

2016 Summer Olympics (UCI–BMX)
 August 17–19: 2016 Summer Olympics (BMX) in  Rio de Janeiro at the Olympic BMX Centre
 Men:   Connor Fields;   Jelle van Gorkom;   Carlos Ramirez
 Women:   Mariana Pajón;   Alise Post;   Stefany Hernández

International BMX championships
 January 31: 2016 Oceania BMX Continental Championships in  Auckland
 Men's Elite winner:  Trent Jones
 Women's Elite winner:  Sarah Walker
 Men's Junior winner:  Maynard Peel
 Women's Junior winner:  Saya Sakakibara
 March 28: 2016 Pan American BMX Continental Championships in  Santiago del Estero
 Men's Elite winner:  Gonzalo Molina
 Women's Elite winner:  Mariana Pajón
 Men's Junior winner:  Wilson Goyes Larrea
 Women's Junior winner:  Paola Reis
 April 24: 2016 North American BMX Continental Championships in  Rock Hill, South Carolina
 Men's Elite winner:  Nicholas Long
 Women's Elite winner:  Alise Post
 Men's Junior winner:  Deven Kawa (default)
 May 25 – 29: 2016 UCI BMX World Championships in  Medellín
 The  won both the gold and overall medal tallies.
 June 12: 2016 Asian BMX Continental Championship in  Taiyuan
 Men's Elite winner:  Jukia Yoshimura
 Women's Elite winner:  Yan Lu
 Men's Junior winner:  Daichi Yamaguchi
 Women's Junior winner:  Sae Hatakeyama
 July 8–10: 2016 UEC European BMX Continental Championships in  Verona
 Men's Elite winner:  Raymon van der Biezen
 Women's Elite winner:  Sarah Sailer
 Men's Elite Time Trial winner:  Romain Mahieu
 Women's Elite Time Trial winner:  Merel Smulders
 Men's Junior winner:  Mathis Ragot Richard
 Women's Junior winner:  Merel Smulders
 October 2: 2016 African BMX Continental Championships in  Giba Gorge, KwaZulu-Natal
 Men's Elite winner:  Kyle Dodd
 Men's Junior winner:  Dylan Eggar

2016 BMX Supercross World Cup
 March 25 & 26: 2016 UCI BMX Supercross World Cup #1 in  Santiago del Estero
 Men's Elite winner:  Corben Sharrah
 Women's Elite winner:  Caroline Buchanan
 April 9 & 10: 2016 UCI BMX Supercross World Cup #2 in  Manchester
 Men's Elite winner:  Liam Phillips
 Women's Elite winner:  Caroline Buchanan
 May 7 & 8: 2016 UCI BMX Supercross World Cup #3 in  Papendal
 Men's Elite winner:  Māris Štrombergs
 Women's Elite winner:  Laura Smulders
 September 30 & October 1: 2016 UCI BMX Supercross World Cup #4 in  Rock Hill, South Carolina
 Men's Elite winner:  Corben Sharrah
 Women's Elite winner:  Laura Smulders
 October 8 & 9: 2016 UCI BMX Supercross World Cup #5 (final) in  Sarasota, Florida
 Men's Elite winner:  Corben Sharrah
 Women's Elite winner:  Laura Smulders

2016 BMX European Cup
 April 1 – 3: European Cup #1 and #2 in  Heusden-Zolder
 Men's Elite #1 winner:  Rihards Veide
 Men's Elite #2 winner:  Dave van der Burg
 Men's Junior #1 winner:  Thomas Jouve
 Men's Junior #2 winner:  Kevin van de Groenendaal
 Women's Elite #1 winner:  Judy Baauw
 Women's Elite #2 winner:  Daina Tuchscherer
 Women's Junior #1 winner:  Merel Smulders
 Women's Junior #2 winner:  Merel Smulders
 April 29 – May 1: European Cup #3 and #4 in  Kampen
 Men's Elite #1 winner:  Kristens Krigers
 Men's Elite #2 winner:  Rihards Veide
 Men's Junior #1 winner:  Léo Avril
 Men's Junior #2 winner:  Thomas Jouve
 Women's Elite #1 winner:  Judy Baauw
 Women's Elite #2 winner:  Judy Baauw
 Women's Junior #1 winner:  Ruby Huisman
 Women's Junior #2 winner:  Merel Smulders
 June 11–13: European Cup #5 and #6 in  Weiterstadt
 Men's Elite #1 winner:  Kristens Krigers
 Men's Elite #2 winner:  Kristens Krigers
 Men's Junior #1 winner:  Paddy Sharrock
 Men's Junior #2 winner:  Cédric Butti
 Women's Elite #1 winner:  Romana Labounková
 Women's Elite #2 winner:  Judy Baauw
 Women's Junior #1 winner:  Merel Smulders
 Women's Junior #2 winner:  Merel Smulders
 September 16–18: European Cup #7 and #8 in  Calais (final)
 Men's Elite #1 winner:  Kyle Evans
 Men's Elite #2 winner:  Rihards Veide
 Men's Junior #1 winner:  Paddy Sharrock
 Men's Junior #2 winner:  Paddy Sharrock
 Women's Elite #1 winner:  Simone Christensen
 Women's Elite #2 winner:  Simone Christensen
 Women's Junior #1 winner:  Merel Smulders
 Women's Junior #2 winner:  Merel Smulders

Cyclo-cross bike racing
 September 16, 2015: CC World Cup #1 in  Las Vegas
 Men's Elite winner:  Wout Van Aert
 Women's Elite winner:  Kateřina Nash
 October 18, 2015: CC World Cup #2 in  Valkenburg aan de Geul
 Men's Elite winner:  Lars van der Haar
 Women's Elite winner:  Eva Lechner
 Men's U23 winner:  Gioele Bertolini
 Men's Junior winner:  Jappe Jaspers
 November 22, 2015: CC World Cup #3 in  Koksijde
 Men's Elite winner:  Sven Nys
 Women's Elite winner:  Sanne Cant
 Men's Under 23 winner:  Eli Iserbyt
 Men's Junior winner:  Jens Dekker
 December 20, 2015: CC World Cup #4 in  Namur, Belgium
 Men's Elite winner:  Mathieu van der Poel
 Women's Elite winner:  Nikki Harris
 Men's Under 23 winner:  Eli Iserbyt
 Men's Junior winner:  Jappe Jaspers
 December 26, 2015: CC World Cup #5 in  Heusden-Zolder
 Men's Elite winner:  Mathieu van der Poel
 Women's Elite winner:  Sanne Cant
 Men's Under 23 winner:  Joris Nieuwenhuis
 Men's Junior winner:  Thomas Bonnet
 January 17: CC World Cup #6 in  Lignières, Cher
 Men's Elite winner:  Mathieu van der Poel
 Women's Elite winner:  Sanne Cant
 Men's Under 23 winner:  Eli Iserbyt
 Men's Junior winner:  Mitch Groot
 January 24: CC World Cup #7 (final) in  Hoogerheide
 Men's Elite winner:  Mathieu van der Poel
 Women's Elite winner:  Sophie de Boer
 Men's Under 23 winner:  Quinten Hermans
 Men's Junior winner:  Jens Dekker
 January 30 & 31: 2016 UCI Cyclo-cross World Championships in  Heusden-Zolder
 Men's Elite winner:  Wout Van Aert
 Women's Elite winner:  Thalita de Jong
 Men's Under 23 winner:  Eli Iserbyt
 Women's Under 23 winner:  Evie Richards
 Men's Junior winner:  Jens Dekker

Cyclo-Cross Cycling UCI Superprestige 2015–2016

 October 4, 2015: CC Superprestige #1 in  Gieten
 Men's Cyclo-Cross winner:  Wout Van Aert
 Women's Cyclo-Cross winner:  Sanne Cant
 Men's Junior Cyclo-Cross winner:  Jens Dekker
 Men's Under 23 Cyclo-Cross winner:  Daan Hoeyberghs
 October 25, 2015: CC Superprestige #2 in  Zonhoven
 Men's Cyclo-Cross winner:  Wout Van Aert
 Women's Cyclo-Cross winner:  Sanne Cant
 Men's Junior Cyclo-Cross winner:  Jens Dekker
 Men's Under 23 Cyclo-Cross winner:  Eli Iserbyt
 November 8, 2015: CC Superprestige #3 in  Ruddervoorde
 Men's Cyclo-Cross winner:  Kevin Pauwels
 Women's Cyclo-Cross winner:  Sanne Cant
 Men's Junior Cyclo-Cross winner:  Jappe Jaspers
 Men's Under 23 Cyclo-Cross winner:  Eli Iserbyt
 November 15, 2015: CC Superprestige #4 in  Gavere
 Men's Cyclo-Cross winner:  Wout Van Aert
 Women's Cyclo-Cross winner:  Sanne Cant
 Men's Junior Cyclo-Cross winner:  Jens Dekker
 Men's Under 23 Cyclo-Cross winner:  Eli Iserbyt
 December 13, 2015: CC Superprestige #5 in  Francorchamps
 Men's Cyclo-Cross winner:  Wout Van Aert
 Women's Cyclo-Cross winner:  Helen Wyman
 Men's Junior Cyclo-Cross winner:  Seppe Rombouts
 Men's Under 23 Cyclo-Cross winner:  Nicolas Cleppe
 December 27, 2015: CC Superprestige #6 in  Diegem
 Men's Cyclo-Cross winner:  Mathieu van der Poel
 Women's Cyclo-Cross winner:  Ellen Van Loy
 Men's Junior Cyclo-Cross winner:  Jappe Jaspers
 Men's Under 23 Cyclo-Cross winner:  Quinten Hermans
 February 7, 2016: CC Superprestige #7 in  Hoogstraten
 Men's Cyclo-Cross winner:  Mathieu van der Poel
 Women's Cyclo-Cross winner:  Sanne Cant
 Men's Under 23 Cyclo-Cross winner:  Eli Iserbyt
 Men's Junior Cyclo-Cross winner:  Jens Dekker
 February 13, 2016: CC Superprestige #8 (final) in  Middelkerke
 Men's Cyclo-Cross winner:  Mathieu van der Poel
 Women's Cyclo-Cross winner:  Sanne Cant
 Men's Under 23 Cyclo-Cross winner:  Eli Iserbyt
 Men's Junior Cyclo-Cross winner:  Jens Dekker

Cyclo-Cross Cycling UCI Bank BPost Trophy 2015–2016

 October 11: Bank BPost Trophy #1 in  Ronse
 Men's winner:  Wout Van Aert
 Women's winner:  Pavla Havlíková
 Men's U23 winner:  Eli Iserbyt
 Men's Junior winner:  Jens Dekker
 November 1: Bank BPost Trophy #2 in  Koppenberg
 Men's winner:  Wout Van Aert
 Women's Cyclo-Cross winner:  Jolien Verschueren
 Men's Under 23 Cyclo-Cross winner:  Quinten Hermans
 Men's Junior Cyclo-Cross winner:  Seppe Rombouts
 November 29: Bank BPost Trophy #3 in  Hamme
 Men's winner:  Wout Van Aert
 Women's winner:  Helen Wyman
 Men's U23 winner:  Eli Iserbyt
 Men's Junior Cyclo-Cross winner:  Florian Vermeersch
 December 5: Bank BPost Trophy #4 in  Essen
 Men's winner:  Wout Van Aert
 Women's Cyclo-Cross winner:  Sanne Cant
 Men's U23 winner:  Quinten Hermans
 Men's Junior Cyclo-Cross winner:  Thijs Wolsink
 December 19: Bank BPost Trophy #5 in  Antwerp
 Men's winner:  Wout Van Aert
 Women's Cyclo-Cross winner:  Sanne Cant
 Men's U23 winner:  Quinten Hermans
 Men's Junior Cyclo-Cross winner:  Reno Bauters
 December 29: Bank BPost Trophy #6 in  Loenhout
 Men's winner:  Tom Meeusen
 Women's Cyclo-Cross winner:  Sanne Cant
 Men's U23 winner:  Daan Hoeyberghs
 Men's Junior Cyclo-Cross winner:  Thijs Wolsink
 January 1: Bank BPost Trophy #7 in  Baal
 Men's winner:  Wout Van Aert
 Women's Cyclo-Cross winner:  Sanne Cant
 Men's U23 winner:  Quinten Hermans
 Men's Junior Cyclo-Cross winner:  Seppe Rombouts
 February 6: Bank BPost Trophy #8 (final) in  Sint-Niklaas
 Men's winner:  Laurens Sweeck
 Women's Cyclo-Cross winner:  Thalita de Jong
 Men's U23 winner:  Daan Soete
 Men's Junior Cyclo-Cross winner:  Jens Dekker

Mountain bike racing
 January 15 – December 4: 2016 UCI Mountain Biking Events Calendar

2016 Summer Olympics (UCI–MB)
 August 20 & 21: 2016 Summer Olympics (MB) in  Rio de Janeiro at the Olympic Mountain Bike Park
 Men's XC:   Nino Schurter;   Jaroslav Kulhavý;   Carlos Coloma Nicolás
 Women's XC:   Jenny Rissveds;   Maja Włoszczowska;   Catharine Pendrel

International mountain biking championships
 March 26 & 27: 2016 Oceania Mountain Bike Continental Championships in  Queenstown, New Zealand
 Men's XC winner:  Anton Cooper
 Women's XC winner:  Rebecca Henderson
 Men's Downhill winner:  Bryn Dickerson
 Women's Downhill winner:  Alanna Columb
 Men's XC Eliminator winner:  Eden Cruise
 Men's U23 (XC) winner:  Ben Oliver
 Women's U23 (XC) winner:  Amber Johnston
 Men's Junior (XC) winner:  Kian Lerch-MacKinnon
 Women's Junior (XC) winner:  Jessica Manchester
 March 30 – April 3: 2016 American Mountain Bike Continental Championships in  San Fernando del Valle de Catamarca
 Men's XC winner:  Catriel Soto
 Women's XC winner:  Daniela Campuzano
 Men's U23 XC winner:  Brandon Rivera
 Women's U23 XC winner:  Yossiana Quintero
 Men's Junior XC winner:  Wilson Pena
 Women's Junior XC winner:  Natalia Rojas Figueroa
 Men's XC Eliminator winner:  Ricky Morales
 Women's XC Eliminator winner:  Noelia Rodriguez
 Mixed XC Team Relay winners:  (Jhon Fredy Gazzon, Brandon Rivera,Yossiana Quintero, Favio Castañeda)
 March 30 – April 3: 2016 African Mountain Bike Continental Championships in  Afriski
 Men's XC winner:  Philip Buys
 Women's XC winner:  Mariske Strauss
 Men's Downhill winner:  Tiaan Odendaal
 Men's U23 (XC) winner:  Alan Hatherly
 Women's U23 (XC) winner:  Genevieve van Coller
 Men's Junior (XC) winner:  Herbert Peters
 Women's Junior (XC) winner:  Danielle Strydom
 Men's Marathon winner:  Yannick Lincoln
 Women's Marathon winner:  Amy McDougall
 Mixed XC Team Relay winners:  (Michelle Vorster, Raul Costa Seibeb, Herbert Peters, Tristan de Lange)
 May 4 – 8: 2016 Asian Mountain Bike Continental Championships in  Chai Nat
 Men's XC winner:  Kohei Yamamoto
 Women's XC winner:  Ren Chengyuan
 Men's Downhill winner:  Kazuki Shimizu
 Women's Downhill winner:  Vipavee Deekaballes
 Men's Junior (XC) winner:  Klahan Master Athichanan
 Women's Junior (XC) winner:  Nathalie Panyawan
 Men's XC Eliminator winner:  Keerati Sukprasart
 Women's XC Eliminator winner:  Warinothorn Phetpraphan
 Mixed XC Team Relay winners:  (Klahan Master Athichanan, Peerapol Chawchiangkwang, Keerati Sukprasart, Supaksorn Nuntana)
 May 5 – 8: 2016 European Mountain Bike Continental Championships in  Jönköping, Huskvarna
 Men's XC winner:  Julien Absalon
 Women's XC winner:  Jolanda Neff
 Men's U23 (XC) winner:  Victor Koretzky
 Women's U23 (XC) winner:  Sina Frei
 Men's Junior (XC) winner:  Thomas Bonnet
 Women's Junior (XC) winner:  Sophie Wright
 Men's XC Eliminator winner:  Emil Linde
 Women's XC Eliminator winner:  Iryna Popova
 Mixed XC Team Relay winners:  (Marcel Guerrini, Vital Albin, Jolanda Neff, Lars Förster)
 June 25 & 26: 2016 UCI Mountain Bike Marathon World Championships in  Laissac
 Men's XC winner:  Tiago Ferreira
 Women's XC winner:  Jolanda Neff
 June 29 – July 3: 2016 UCI Mountain Bike & Trials World Championships (XCO & XCE only) in  Nové Město na Moravě
 Men's XC winner:  Nino Schurter
 Women's XC winner:  Annika Langvad
 Men's U23 (XC) winner:  Sam Gaze
 Women's U23 (XC) winner:  Jenny Rissveds
 Men's Junior (XC) winner:  Thomas Bonnet
 Women's Junior (XC) winner:  Ida Jansson
 Men's XC Eliminator winner:  Daniel Federspiel
 Women's XC Eliminator winner:  Linda Indergand
 Mixed team relay winners:  (Victor Koretzky, Benjamin le Ny, Pauline Ferrand-Prévot, Jordan Sarrou)
 September 6–11: 2016 UCI Mountain Bike & Trials World Championships (DHI & 4X only) in  Val di Sole
 Men's Elite Downhill winner:  Danny Hart
 Women's Elite Downhill winner:  Rachel Atherton
 Men's Junior Downhill winner:  Finnley Iles
 Women's Junior Downhill winner:  Alessia Missiaggia
 Men's 4X winner:  Mitja Ergaver
 Women's 4X winner:  Caroline Buchanan

2016 UCI Mountain Bike World Cup
 April 9 & 10: World Cup #1 in  Lourdes
 Men's Elite Downhill winner:  Aaron Gwin
 Women's Elite Downhill winner:  Rachel Atherton
 Men's Junior Downhill winner:  Finnley Iles
 April 23 & 24: World Cup #2 in  Cairns
 Men's Elite Downhill winner:  Loïc Bruni
 Women's Elite Downhill winner:  Rachel Atherton
 Men's Elite XC winner:  Nino Schurter
 Women's Elite XC winner:  Annika Langvad
 Men's U23 XC winner:  Sam Gaze
 Women's U23 XC winner:  Kate Courtney
 Men's Junior Downhill winner:  Matt Walker
 May 21 & 22: World Cup #3 in  Albstadt
 Men's Elite XC winner:  Nino Schurter
 Women's Elite XC winner:  Annika Langvad
 Men's U23 XC winner:  Sam Gaze
 Women's U23 XC winner:  Sina Frei
 May 28 & 29: World Cup #4 in  La Bresse
 Men's Elite XC winner:  Julien Absalon
 Women's Elite XC winner:  Jolanda Neff
 Men's U23 XC winner:  Titouan Carod
 Women's U23 XC winner:  Sina Frei
 June 4 & 5: World Cup #5 in  Fort William, Highland
 Men's Elite Downhill winner:  Greg Minnaar
 Women's Elite Downhill winner:  Rachel Atherton
 Men's Junior Downhill winner:  Finnley Iles
 June 11 & 12: World Cup #6 in  Leogang
 Men's Elite Downhill winner:  Aaron Gwin
 Women's Elite Downhill winner:  Rachel Atherton
 Men's Junior Downhill winner:  Gaëtan Vige
 July 9 & 10: World Cup #7 in  Lenzerheide
 Men's Elite XC winner:  Nino Schurter
 Women's Elite XC winner:  Jenny Rissveds
 Men's Elite Downhill winner:  Danny Hart
 Women's Elite Downhill winner:  Tahnee Seagrave
 Men's Junior Downhill winner:  Finnley Iles
 Men's U23 XC winner:  Titouan Carod
 Women's U23 XC winner:  Sina Frei
 August 6 & 7: World Cup #8 in  Mont-Sainte-Anne
 Men's Elite XC winner:  Julien Absalon
 Women's Elite XC winner:  Catharine Pendrel
 Men's Elite Downhill winner:  Danny Hart
 Women's Elite Downhill winner:  Rachel Atherton
 Men's Junior Downhill winner:  Gaëtan Vige
 Men's U23 XC winner:  Titouan Carod
 Women's U23 XC winner:  Sina Frei
 September 3 & 4: World Cup #9 (final) in  Vallnord
 Men's Elite XC winner:  Julien Absalon
 Women's Elite XC winner:  Jolanda Neff
 Men's Elite Downhill winner:  Danny Hart
 Women's Elite Downhill winner:  Rachel Atherton
 Men's Junior Downhill winner:  Gaëtan Vige
 Men's U23 XC winner:  Marcel Guerrini
 Women's U23 XC winner:  Sina Frei

Road cycling

2016 Summer Olympics

 Men's road race:  ;  ;  
 Women's road race:  ;  ;  
 Men's time trial:  ;  ;  
 Women's time trial:  ;  ;

UCI Road World Championships

Continental cycling championships

Grand Tours
 May 6 – 29: 2016 Giro d'Italia
 Winner:  Vincenzo Nibali (second Giro d'Italia win, fourth Grand Tour win)
 July 2–24: 2016 Tour de France 
 Winner:  Chris Froome (third Tour de France win, third Grand Tour win)
 August 20 – September 11: 2016 Vuelta a España
 Winner:  Nairo Quintana (first Vuelta a España win, second Grand Tour win)

UCI World Tour

UCI Women's WorldTour

UCI Continental Tours

Track cycling
 October 30, 2015 – 2016: 2015–16 UCI Track Cycling Calendar of Events

2016 Summer Olympics (UCI–TC)
 April 30 & May 1: Aquece Rio International Track Cycling Challenge 2016 in  Rio de Janeiro (Olympic Test Event)
 Note: Event cancelled, due to venue not ready for competition yet.
 August 11–16: 2016 Summer Olympics (TC) in  Rio de Janeiro at the Barra Velodrome
 Men
 Men's Keirin:   Jason Kenny;   Matthijs Büchli;   Azizulhasni Awang
 Men's Omnium:   Elia Viviani;   Mark Cavendish;   Lasse Norman Hansen
 Men's Sprint:   Jason Kenny;   Callum Skinner;   Denis Dmitriev
 Men's Team Pursuit:   (WR);  ;  
 Men's Team Sprint:   (OR);  ;  
 Women
 Women's Keirin:   Elis Ligtlee;   Becky James;   Anna Meares
 Women's Omnium:   Laura Trott;   Sarah Hammer;   Jolien D'Hoore
 Women's Sprint:   Kristina Vogel;   Becky James;   Katy Marchant
 Women's Team Pursuit:   (WR);  ;  
 Women's Team Sprint:
   (Gong Jinjie & Zhong Tianshi)
   (Daria Shmeleva & Anastasia Voynova)
   (Miriam Welte & Kristina Vogel)

International track cycling events
 January 26–30: 2016 Asian Cycling Championships in  Izu, Shizuoka

  and  won 6 gold medals each. South Korea won the overall medal tally.
 February 15 – 19: 2016 African Track Championships in  Casablanca

  won both the gold and overall medal tallies.
 March 2–6: 2016 UCI Track Cycling World Championships in  London

  won both the gold and overall medal tallies.
 March 17–20: 2016 UCI Para-cycling Track World Championships in  Montichiari
  won both the gold and overall medal tallies.
 July 20–24: 2016 UCI Juniors Track World Championships in  Aigle
  won both the gold and overall medal tallies.
 October 5–9: 2016 Pan American Track Cycling Championships in  Aguascalientes City
  won both the gold and overall medal tallies.
 October 19–23: 2016 European Track Cycling Championships in  Paris (Saint-Quentin-en-Yvelines)
  and  won 3 gold medals each.  and the  won 8 overall medals each.

2015–16 UCI Track Cycling World Cup
 October 30, 2015 – November 1, 2015: World Cup #1 in  Cali

  won both the gold and overall medal tallies.
 December 5 & 6, 2015: World Cup #2 in  Cambridge, New Zealand

  won the gold medal tally. Germany and Team Jayco–AIS won 5 overall medals each.
 January 16 & 17: World Cup #3 (final) in 

  won the gold medal tally.  won the overall medal tally.

Trial cycling
 May 28 & 29: Trial World Cup #1 in  Kraków
 Men's Elite 20" winner:  Benito Ros
 Men's Elite 26" winner:  Aurelien Fontenoy
 Women's Elite winner:  Nina Reichenbach
 July 9 & 10: Trial World Cup #2 in  Les Menuires
 Men's Elite 20" winner:  Dominik Oswald
 Men's Elite 26" winner:  Jack Carthy
 Women's Elite winner:  Nina Reichenbach
 July 30 & 31: Trial World Cup #3 in  Vöcklabruck
 Men's Elite 20" winner:  Abel Mustieles
 Men's Elite 26" winner:  Jack Carthy
 Women's Elite winner:  Nina Reichenbach
 August 20 & 21: Trial World Cup #4 in  Albertville
 Men's Elite 20" winner:  Abel Mustieles
 Men's Elite 26" winner:  Jack Carthy
 Women's Elite winner:  Nina Reichenbach
 August 29 – September 3: 2016 UCI Trials World Championships in  Vermiglio–Val di Sole
 Men's Elite 20" winner:  Abel Mustieles
 Men's Elite 26" winner:  Jack Carthy
 Women's Elite winner:  Nina Reichenbach
 September 24 & 25: Trial World Cup #5 (final) in  Antwerp
 Men's Elite 20" winner:  Abel Mustieles
 Men's Elite 26" winner:  Jack Carthy
 Women's Elite winner:  Janine Jungfels

Games
 February 6–9: South Asian Games in  Guwahati
 March 17–20: World University Cycling Championship in  Tagaytay
 August 6–21: Summer Olympics in  Rio de Janeiro
 September 8–17: Summer Paralympics in  Rio de Janeiro

References

 
2016 in sports
Cycle sport by year